San Felipe Barcelona is a Belizean football team, currently playing in the Premier League of Belize.

The team is based in San Felipe, Orange Walk District. Their home stadium is San Felipe Football Field.

History
The team was founded in 2006 as Alpha Glitters Football Club, was renamed Alpha Barcelona in the summer of 2007 and changed its name before the 2008/2009 season to its current name.

Current squad

External links
San Felipe Barcelona

Football clubs in Belize
Super League of Belize
2006 establishments in Belize
Association football clubs established in 2006